The 1937 VFL Grand Final was an Australian rules football game contested between the Geelong Football Club and Collingwood Football Club, held at the Melbourne Cricket Ground in Melbourne on 25 September 1937. It was the 39th annual grand final of the Victorian Football League, staged to determine the premiers for the 1937 VFL season. The match, attended by a then-record crowd of 88,540 spectators, was won by Geelong by a margin of 32 points, marking that club's third premiership victory and first since winning the 1931 VFL Grand Final.

Due to the excellent display of skills, as well as the vigorous but fair play, and the closeness of the contest that was not decided until late in the last quarter, this Grand Final was regarded by many contemporaries as the greatest ever played.

Background
Geelong took out the minor premiership by finishing with 15 wins from 18 games. A 12-point win over Melbourne saw Geelong advance to the grand final against reigning premiers Collingwood.

Teams

Match Summary

First Quarter
Collingwood captain Harry Collier won the toss and the Magpies kicked with a slight breeze.
The Magpies raced to an early three-goal lead before Geelong cut the deficit to five points at the main break. Scores were level at three quarter time before a six-goal to one final term saw the Cats take the flag.

Critical Reviews
The game was universally praised by the football media. In his match report for The Argus, former Melbourne star and Brownlow medallist Ivor Warne-Smith was particularly effusive about the fair nature of the spectacle:

It was all clean, open football that was a delight to watch and by giving such an exhibition of manly, fair play Geelong and Collingwood have set an example of the way to play the game which should be followed by other teams for all time.

Scorecard

Goal kickers

Aftermath
According to the Geelong Advertiser, the Geelong players were accorded a rousing public reception when they returned via a special evening train. However, two players were unable to board and had to wait at Spencer Street for the ordinary train back to Geelong.

See also
 1937 VFL season

References

Bibliography
 
 The Official statistical history of the AFL 2004 
 Ross, J. (ed), 100 Years of Australian Football 1897-1996: The Complete Story of the AFL, All the Big Stories, All the Great Pictures, All the Champions, Every AFL Season Reported, Viking, (Ringwood), 1996.

External Links
 AFL Tables: 1937 Grand Final
 1937 (Archived 2009-09-24)

VFL/AFL Grand Finals
Grand
Geelong Football Club
Collingwood Football Club
September 1937 sports events